Lone Star is a ghost town in Cherokee County, located in the U.S. state of Texas.

Notes

Geography of Cherokee County, Texas
Ghost towns in East Texas